Pesyanka is a rural locality (a village) and the administrative center of Savinskoye Rural Settlement, Permsky District, Perm Krai, Russia. The population was 2,814 as of 2010. There are 10 streets.

Geography 
Pesyanka is located 15 km southwest of Perm (the district's administrative centre) by road. Khmeli is the nearest rural locality.

References 

Rural localities in Permsky District